= Revisiting Moral Panics =

- Language: English
- Publisher: Policy Press
- Publication date: 2015
- Pages: 316
- ISBN: 978-1447321859

Revisiting Moral Panics is an academic book edited by Mark Smith, Vivienne E. Cree and Gary Clapton. It contains twenty chapters by researchers from three different countries and was published in 2015 by Policy Press. The book discusses the concept of moral panic and its relation to modern social issues. It combines contributions from academics and social work practitioners regarding gender and family life, childhood and youth, the state and citizenship, and moral regulation.
